This is a list of Doctor Who serials and episodes that have been released on DVD and Blu-ray.

DVD

Release  
Most Doctor Who DVDs have been released first in the United Kingdom with Region 2, and released later in Australia and New Zealand (Region 4) and in North America (Region 1). Aside from differences in the external packaging, special features and commentaries are mostly identical in all versions. All Region 1 releases prior to September 2005 included a "Who's Who" feature that identified key cast members and gave brief biographies and filmographies. The Region 1 releases of The Robots of Death, The Ark in Space, The Talons of Weng-Chiang, and Pyramids of Mars also include a featurette with the syndicated Time Life introductions and closings narrated by Howard da Silva.

There are also minor variations having to do with technical glitches that occurred in the Region 2 discs but were corrected in time for the Region 1 release (The Caves of Androzani, Remembrance of the Daleks, Complete Series Two box set). The Region 2 discs released up to 2009 have also been dual coded with Region 4, so the two have been identical; this practice ceased for new releases in 2010. The only exceptions are Vengeance on Varos, which fixed an error on the Region 2 version in episode 2, and Remembrance of the Daleks, which used the NTSC master due to errors on the UK version and issues about music clearance.

Features 
With few exceptions (noted below), each of the 'classic series' stories have been carefully restored by the Doctor Who Restoration Team from the best available materials, and are presented as originally broadcast—in episodic format, where applicable. Other features present on every (or nearly every) DVD include cast and crew commentary, subtitles, production notes, and a photo gallery.

"Special edition" releases (which make up the bulk of the line; see above) also typically include one or more documentaries relating to the serial in question, any relevant archive material, and—where applicable—the occasional highlight such as a Dolby 5.1 mix or enhanced movie edit. The precise features vary, depending on the available resources and the nature of the story.

Most, but not all, Doctor Who mini-episodes, prequels and webcasts are bundled as part of the DVD and Blu-ray releases. For example, five prelude videos were released online as part of series 6, and these are extras on the series 6 box set. Some Doctor Who webcasts were released on their own special DVDs.

Blu-ray

Release  
"Planet of the Dead" was the first Doctor Who episode to be filmed and broadcast in high definition. It was released on Blu-ray on the same day as its corresponding DVD in Region 2. All subsequent episodes (excluding the animated Dreamland) have also been filmed and broadcast in high-definition and released on Blu-ray, usually simultaneously with the corresponding DVDs. An upscaled version of "The Next Doctor" (which was shot in standard definition) was also released on Blu-ray as part of a box set containing all of the 2008–2010 specials. It was also released individually in Australia and New Zealand. In 2011, the 1975 Doctor Who serial Pyramids of Mars was included on both the DVD and Blu-ray box sets for The Sarah Jane Adventures Season 4.

Spearhead from Space, the only serial of the classic series shot completely on film, was released on Blu-ray on 15 July 2013 with exclusive bonus features. The 1996 telemovie received a Blu-ray release on 19 September 2016. Despite being shot entirely on film, the Blu-ray release is simply an HD upscale of the 480i broadcast copy. A Limited edition Blu-ray box-set containing Series 1-7 of Doctor Who  was released 5 November 2013. Series 1-4 was shot on Standard Definition video but upscaled and remastered to full 1080p for this release.

The Collection 
The classic-era began to receive complete season Blu-ray releases from 2018 onward, under the banner "The Collection". In 2021, the BBC rebranded the range as "The Collection Limited Edition Packaging", with the original "The Collection" name to be used for standard edition versions of the releases.

Specifications 
Episodes released on Blu-ray starting with "Planet of the Dead" were shot in full 1080p High Definition and have been released with DTS-HD High Resolution 5.1 soundtracks. All Ninth and Tenth Doctor episodes appearing on Blu-ray produced prior to "Planet of the Dead" have been upscaled to 1080p for those releases. The first classic series serial released on Blu-ray in HD, Spearhead from Space, was shot entirely on 16mm film and true 1080p masters for those episodes were produced from the original film elements; the Blu-ray release was in 1080i.  Other classic series releases have been upscaled, with HD film scans inserted where possible, and some releases use specially made animated elements. "Twice Upon a Time" (2017), Peter Capaldi's final episode, was released on 4K Ultra HD Blu-ray in 2018.

Releases 
All releases are for DVD unless otherwise indicated:
  indicates a DVD release for a specific date
  indicates a Blu-ray release
  indicates a simultaneous DVD and Blu-ray release
  indicates a 3D Blu-ray release (includes DVD and Blu-ray)
  indicates a simultaneous DVD and 3D Blu-ray (includes Blu-ray) release
  indicates an Ultra HD Blu-ray release (includes Blu-ray)

First Doctor 
Starring William Hartnell as the First Doctor. All surviving First Doctor serials and episodes were released on DVD from 2002 to 2013. The surviving serials and episodes of Season 2 were released on Blu-ray in 2022.

All existing episodes from otherwise missing First Doctor serials have been released on the Lost in Time collection, with the exception of: Galaxy 4 episode 3, which was released as part of The Aztecs – Special Edition; The Reign of Terror which had its missing episodes animated for its individual DVD release; and The Tenth Planet which had its missing episode animated for its release as part of the Regeneration Box and individual DVD release. Lost in Time was released in two formats in Region 1, with individual releases for volumes one and two (which cover First Doctor and Second Doctor episodes respectively), as well as an edition combining both volumes. In Regions 2 and 4, Lost in Time is available only as the combined single volume.

Second Doctor 
Starring Patrick Troughton as the Second Doctor. All surviving Second Doctor serials and episodes were released on DVD from 2002 to 2016.

All existing episodes from otherwise missing Second Doctor serials have been released on the Lost in Time collection, with the exceptions of: The Underwater Menace episode 2 and The Web of Fear episodes 2, 4, 5 and 6, which were recovered after the release of Lost in Time; The Ice Warriors and The Invasion which had their missing episodes animated for its DVD release. The collection also included episode 3 of The Enemy of the World, which (at the time of the collection's release) was the only extant episode from that serial. Lost in Time was released in two formats in Region 1, with individual releases for Volumes 1 and 2 (which cover First Doctor and Second Doctor episodes, respectively), as well as an edition combining both volumes. In Regions 2 and 4, Lost in Time is available only as the combined single volume.

Third Doctor 
Starring Jon Pertwee as the Third Doctor. All Third Doctor serials were released on DVD from 2001 to 2013. The entire Season 10 was released on Blu-ray in 2019, Season 8 was released in 2021, with Season 9 following in 2023.

Fourth Doctor 
Starring Tom Baker as the Fourth Doctor. All Fourth Doctor serials were released on DVD from 2000 to 2013. The entire Seasons 12, 14, 17 and 18 were released on Blu-ray between 2018 and 2021.

Fifth Doctor 
Starring Peter Davison as the Fifth Doctor. All Fifth Doctor serials were released on DVD from 1999 to 2011. The entire Season 19 was released on Blu-ray in 2018.

Sixth Doctor 
Starring Colin Baker as the Sixth Doctor. All Sixth Doctor serials were released on DVD from 2001 to 2012. The Season 23 was released on Blu-ray in 2019 whilst Season 22 in 2022

Seventh Doctor 
Starring Sylvester McCoy as the Seventh Doctor. All Seventh Doctor serials were released on DVD from 2001 to 2012. The Season 26 was released on Blu-ray in 2020.
Season 24 was released on Blu-ray in 2021

Eighth Doctor 
Starring Paul McGann as the Eighth Doctor. The only Eighth Doctor full television adventure was released on DVD in 2001.

Ninth Doctor 
Starring Christopher Eccleston as the Ninth Doctor. All Ninth Doctor episodes were released in Region 2 on DVD in 2005 and Blu-ray in 2013

Tenth Doctor 
Starring David Tennant as the Tenth Doctor. All Tenth Doctor episodes were released on DVD and Blu-ray from 2006 to 2013.

Eleventh Doctor 
Starring Matt Smith as the Eleventh Doctor. All Eleventh Doctor episodes were released on DVD and Blu-ray from 2010 to 2014.

Twelfth Doctor 
Starring Peter Capaldi as the Twelfth Doctor. All Twelfth Doctor episodes were released on DVD and Blu-ray from 2014 to 2018.

Thirteenth Doctor 
Starring Jodie Whittaker as the Thirteenth Doctor. All Thirteenth Doctor episodes were released on DVD and Blu-ray from 2019 to 2023.

Special releases

Compilations 

Some releases compile previously released serials and episodes from both the classic and/or revived series. Generally, these compilations do not carry over the bonus material from previous releases.

Alternative feature-length versions 
The Curse of Fenric, Battlefield, Enlightenment and Planet of Fire. Some have re-edited feature-length versions on a bonus disc, while others have a reduced edit with additional footage and new special effects, as well as a remixed 5.1 surround soundtrack. The alternative versions of Enlightenment and Planet of Fire are presented in 16:9 widescreen rather than the original 4:3 aspect ratio. The Curse of Fenric and Battlefield are extended edits with new scenes added, while Enlightenment and Planet of Fire are cut down in length to make them more like modern Doctor Who stories. Day of The Daleks featured the original four 25-minute episodes, re-edited, with new CGI, new Dalek voices by Nicholas Briggs and new specially shot scenes filmed at the original locations.

Animated stories 
 Scream of the Shalka is a six-part animated serial which was produced for the 40th Anniversary of the show in 2003. The story featured Richard E. Grant as an alternative version of the Ninth Doctor. When the show returned in 2005, this story was no longer considered part of the BBC's canon. It was aired exclusively on BBCi's website and later through the BBC's red button service. It was released on DVD on 16 September 2013.
 The Infinite Quest is a 13-part animated serial, the first 12 parts of which were originally shown on Totally Doctor Who. Although the serial is not a part of series 3, it features the Doctor and Martha Jones. It was run as a complete 45-minute episode after the series came to an end. It was released on DVD in Region 2 on 12 November 2007, Region 4 on 5 June 2008 and Region 1 on 18 November 2008.
 Dreamland is a six-part animated serial (1 × 12 min., 5 × 6 min.). They were broadcast daily on the BBC's Red Button service from 21 November 2009. It was released on DVD in Region 2 on 1 February 2010 and in Region 1 release on 5 October 2010. Though made in high definition, no Blu-ray is currently planned.

DVD releases of theatrical feature films 
Film remakes based on the first two Dalek television stories were produced in 1965 (Dr. Who and the Daleks) and 1966 (Daleks' Invasion Earth: 2150 A.D.) starring Peter Cushing as "Dr. Who". These two theatrical movies do not take place within the established canon of Doctor Who. The two films have been released as a boxed set (often with the Dalekmania documentary on a separate disc), first in region 4 (9 May 2001), then region 1 (22 November 2001) and later region 2 (29 July 2002). It was also re-released in region 2 (25 September 2006) with a new cover.

See also 
List of other Doctor Who home video releases
Lists of Doctor Who episodes
Doctor Who missing episodes
Doctor Who Restoration Team

References

Bibliography

External links 
 The TARDIS Library: DVDs & videos—Comprehensive database of official & unofficial Doctor Who DVD releases across the globe.
 Steve Manfred's Doctor Who DVD FAQ, with full details on all North American releases. Frequently updated.

Video
DVD
Lists of home video releases